Derek J. Hallworth is a British television director. Regular credits include Countdown and Mastermind.

See also
List of British game shows

References

External links

Year of birth missing (living people)
Living people
British television directors
Place of birth missing (living people)